is a passenger railway station in the town of  Kōya, Ito District, Wakayama Prefecture, Japan, operated by the private railway company Nankai Electric Railway.

Lines
Kii-Hosokawa  Station is served by the Nankai Kōya Line, and is located 60.6 kilometers from the terminus of the line at Shiomibashi Station and 59.9 kilometers from Namba Station.

Station layout
The station consists of two opposed side platforms connected to the station building by a level crossing. The station is unattended.

Platforms

Adjacent stations

History
It was renamed to its present name on March 1, 1930.

Passenger statistics
In fiscal 2019, the station was used by an average of 20 passengers daily (boarding passengers only).

Surrounding area
 Takano Municipal Former Nishi Hosokawa Elementary School

See also
List of railway stations in Japan

References

External links

 Kii-Hosokawa Station Official Site

Railway stations in Japan opened in 1928
Railway stations in Wakayama Prefecture
Kōya, Wakayama